Judge Brady may refer to:

Holly A. Brady (born 1969), judge of the United States District Court for the Northern District of Indiana
James Joseph Brady (1944–2017), judge of the United States District Court for the Middle District of Louisiana

See also
Justice Brady (disambiguation)